An Evening with Ronnie Drew is an album by Ronnie Drew, released in 2004. Drew recorded this album with Mike Hanrahan while on tour in Europe in the autumn of 2004.

Track listing
 "Finnegan's Wake"
 "McAlpine's Fusiliers"
 "Waltzing Matilda"
 "Two Island Swans"
 "Firefighter"
 "The Auld Triangle"
 "Nora"
 "The Sick Note"
 "Someone Like You"
 "La Quinta Brigada"
 "We Had It All"
 "Dicey Reilly"
 "Dirty Old Town"
 "Parting Glass"

Ronnie Drew albums
2004 live albums